The North American Club Championship refers to two soccer tournaments:

 1990 North American Club Championship (2 teams)
 Professional Cup (8 teams)